The Freedom Museum (Dutch: Vrijheidsmuseum), until September 2019 National Liberation Museum 1944-1945, is a museum in Groesbeek, the museum is about the liberation of the Netherlands at the end of World War II. The museum is located in Groesbeek, close to the German border.

The structure shaped like a parachute was built in remembrance of the Rhineland Offensive (Operation Veritable, Operation Grenade, Operation Blockbuster, Operation Plunder and Operation Varsity)  and of the Airdrop of thousands of allied paratroopers on the fields in Groesbeek during Operation Market Garden.

Notes and references

External links 
 

World War II museums in the Netherlands
World War II museums
Berg en Dal (municipality)